Lee Hsien Yang (born 24 September 1957) is a Singaporean businessman. He is the son of Lee Kuan Yew, the first prime minister of Singapore. His is also the younger brother of Lee Hsien Loong, the third prime minister of Singapore.

Education
Lee attended Catholic High School and National Junior College before graduating from Trinity College, Cambridge with a double first in engineering science under the President's Scholarship and Singapore Armed Forces Overseas Scholarship awarded by the Public Service Commission.

He subsequently went on to complete a Master of Science degree in management at Stanford University.

Career
Lee enlisted in the Singapore Armed Forces (SAF) in 1976, and has held several command and staff appointments such as the Commander of the second Singapore Infantry Brigade, and had attained the rank of Brigadier-General before retiring in 1994.

After retiring from the military, Lee joined SingTel in April 1994 as Executive Vice President of Local Services. In May 1995, he became CEO of SingTel, where he served until March 2007.

In September 2007, Fraser and Neave appointed Lee as a Non-Executive Director and Chairman-designate with effect from 6 September 2007. Lee assumed the position of Non-Executive Chairman on 15 October 2007.

On 1 July 2009, Lee was appointed Chairman of the Civil Aviation Authority of Singapore by Minister for Transport Raymond Lim.

On 26 February 2013, it was announced that Lee had stepped down from the board of Fraser and Neave.

Lee has held other positions: Board Member and Chairman of the Audit Committee of the Singapore Exchange; Independent Director of the Islamic Bank of Asia, and the Australia and New Zealand Banking Group Limited; Member of the Governing Board of the Lee Kuan Yew School of Public Policy; Member of the Board of Asia Pacific Investment; Chairman of Republic Polytechnic; Member of the International Advisory Board of Rolls-Royce Holdings.

Lee stepped down as Chairman of the Civil Aviation Authority of Singapore on 1 July 2018.

Political involvement
Although in 2006, Lee said that he has "no great interest to pursue a career in politics", he joined the Progress Singapore Party (PSP) led by the former Member of Parliament (MP) Tan Cheng Bock, on 24 June 2020, claiming that the People's Action Party (PAP) has "lost its way", and that it is no longer the PAP of its "founding principles that Lee Kuan Yew had envisioned". The PSP was one of the opposition parties that ran in the 2020 Singaporean general election against the PAP, which is led by Lee's elder brother, Prime Minister Lee Hsien Loong.

Lee ultimately decided not to run as a candidate for the 2020 general election, stating that "Singapore doesn't need another Lee".

In 2023, Lee hinted in a phone call interview from Europe on running for President of Singapore, which is held that year. However, it has been cited that he may not meet the eligibility requirements due to ongoing police investigations against him and his wife, Lim Suet Fern, over allegedly giving false evidence in the proceedings over his father Lee Kuan Yew's will.

Personal life
Lee is the younger son and youngest child of Lee Kuan Yew, former prime minister of Singapore, and Kwa Geok Choo, a lawyer. His elder brother, Lee Hsien Loong, is the current prime minister. His elder sister, Lee Wei Ling, is a former director of the National Neuroscience Institute.

Lee first met Lim Suet Fern, the daughter of the economist Lim Chong Yah, while he was studying at University of Cambridge. They were married in July 1981. Lim would later become the founder and managing partner of Stamford Law Corporation and a president of the Inter-Pacific Bar Association (IPBA). The couple have three sons: Li Shengwu, Li Huanwu, and Li Shaowu. Their eldest son, Li Shengwu, is currently serving as Assistant Professor of Economics at Harvard University. He graduated from Balliol College of the University of Oxford as the top student in the Philosophy, Politics and Economics programme in 2009, received a Master of Philosophy degree in economics from Oxford in 2011, and received a PhD from Stanford University in 2016.

His child Li Huanwu came out as gay in July 2018.  Li Huanwu married his partner, Heng Yirui, a vet working for Mandai Wildlife Group,  in South Africa on 24 May 2019.

Administrator of Lee Kuan Yew's will
Lee and his sister, Lee Wei Ling, are the joint administrators and executors of Lee Kuan Yew's will. However, they were in a dispute in 2017 with Lee Hsien Loong over their late father's will with regard to the house at 38 Oxley Road. They "felt threatened by Lee Hsien Loong's misuse of his position and influence over the Singapore government and its agencies to drive his personal agenda". They alleged that their brother thwarted the will of their father in order to use the house as a monument to milk his father's legacy. They also criticised the influence of Ho Ching over the government, and alleged that the Prime Minister harboured political ambitions for his son, Li Hongyi. A special parliamentary session was held to clear the Prime Minister of any wrongdoings and the siblings agreed to keep the dispute private after the session. However, this ultimately did not become the case.

References

1957 births
Living people
Lee family (Singapore)
Alumni of Trinity College, Cambridge
Stanford University alumni
People from Dabu
Singaporean people of Hakka descent
National Junior College alumni
Catholic High School, Singapore alumni
Stanford Graduate School of Business alumni
Stanford Sloan Fellows
Singaporean chief executives
President's Scholars
Recipients of the Pingat Jasa Gemilang